The Elan d'or Association Award is an award presented at the Elan d'or Awards in Japan, established in 1961. In 1994, it was renamed the Producer Award.

References

External links
 

Awards established in 1961
Japanese film awards
1961 establishments in Japan